Sagaing Technological University is located in Sagaing, Myanmar. It was initially established as Technical High School on 17 September 1990. On 1 December 1998, it was upgraded to a Government Technical Institute. It became a Government Technological College on 20 January 2007 and a Technological University on 23 February 2012.

Departments 

Civil Engineering Department
Electronic and Communication Department
Electrical Power Engineering Department
Mechanical Engineering Department
Academic Department
Myanmar Department
Engineering Mathematics Department
Engineering Physics Department
Engineering Chemistry Department
Internet Department
English Department

Program 
The university offers Bachelor of Engineering.
 
Bachelor of Engineering (Civil)
Bachelor of Engineering (Electronic)
Bachelor of Engineering (Electrical Power)
Bachelor of Engineering (Mechanical)

References 

Universities and colleges in Sagaing Region
Technological universities in Myanmar